The 2016 Middle Tennessee Blue Raiders football team represented Middle Tennessee State University as a member of the East Division of Conference USA (C-USA) during the 2016 NCAA Division I FBS football season. Led by 11th-year head coach Rick Stockstill, the Blue Raiders compiled an overall record of 8–5 with a mark of 5–3  in conference play, placing third in the C-USA's East Division. Middle Tennessee was invited to the  Hawaii Bowl, where they lost to Hawaii.. The team played home games at Johnny "Red" Floyd Stadium in Murfreesboro, Tennessee.

Schedule
Middle Tennessee announced its 2016 football schedule on February 4, 2016. The 2016 schedule consisted of five home and seven away games in the regular season.

Game summaries

Alabama A&M

at Vanderbilt

at Bowling Green

Louisiana Tech

at North Texas

WKU

at Missouri

at FIU

UTSA

at Marshall

at Charlotte

Florida Atlantic

vs Hawaii–Hawaii Bowl

References

Middle Tennessee
Middle Tennessee Blue Raiders football seasons
Middle Tennessee Blue Raiders football